Our Lady of Lourdes Church Complex is an historic Roman Catholic church complex at 901–903 Atwells Avenue in Providence, Rhode Island within the Diocese of Providence.

Description
Our Lady of Lourdes consists of four buildings: a church, rectory, school, and convent.  The church is a steel-frame structure clad in brick, designed by Ambrose Murphy and built in 1925.  The rectory is a two-story brick structure with hip roof; it was built in 1912.  The original rectory, built in 1905 to a design by Walter Fontaine, was converted for use as a convent when the new rectory was built.  The school building, also built in 1905 to a Fontaine design, is the largest structure in the complex, and originally served as both school and church until the student population grew too large for the educational facilities.

The complex was listed on the National Register of Historic Places in 1990.

See also
 Catholic Church in the United States
 Catholic parish church
 Index of Catholic Church articles
 National Register of Historic Places listings in Providence, Rhode Island
 Pastoral care

References

External links 

Official site of the Holy See

Churches in the Roman Catholic Diocese of Providence
Roman Catholic churches completed in 1905
20th-century Roman Catholic church buildings in the United States
Churches on the National Register of Historic Places in Rhode Island
Churches in Providence, Rhode Island
Roman Catholic churches in Rhode Island
National Register of Historic Places in Providence, Rhode Island
Houses on the National Register of Historic Places in Rhode Island
School buildings on the National Register of Historic Places in Rhode Island
1905 establishments in Rhode Island